The Wild Dakotas is a 1956 American Western film directed by Sam Newfield and written by Tom W. Blackburn. The film stars Bill Williams, Coleen Gray, Jim Davis, John Litel, Dick Jones, John Miljan and Lisa Montell. The film was released on February 28, 1956, by Associated Film Releasing Corporation.

Plot

Cast          
Bill Williams as Jim Henry
Coleen Gray as Sue 'Lucky' Duneen
Jim Davis as Aaron Baring
John Litel as Morgan Wheeler
Dick Jones as Mike McGeehee 
John Miljan as Chief Antelope
Lisa Montell as Ruth Murphy
I. Stanford Jolley as Tabor 
Wally Brown as McGraw
Iron Eyes Cody as Red Rock
Billy Dix as Wagon Scout

References

External links
 

1956 films
1950s English-language films
American Western (genre) films
1956 Western (genre) films
Films directed by Sam Newfield
1950s American films
American black-and-white films